Santa María de Pantasma is a municipality in the Jinotega department of Nicaragua.

Municipalities of the Jinotega Department